The 1956 Cleveland Browns season was the team's eleventh season, and seventh season with the National Football League.

This was the first season in which the Browns missed the playoffs, and its first season with a losing record. The Browns lost seven games in 1956, after having lost a total of only 17 over the previous ten seasons combined.

Exhibition schedule

Regular season

Schedule 

Note: Intra-conference opponents are in bold text.

Season recap

Week 1 at Chicago 
The post Otto Graham era begins with a 9-7 loss to the Cardinals in Chicago. Cleveland's only score comes on a 46-yard touchdown pass from George Ratterman to Ray Renfro in the first quarter. But Pat Summerall's third field goal, a nine-yarder with 29 seconds remaining, won it for the Cardinals and broke a twelve-game losing streak to the Browns. The Cardinals later won the season finale.

Standings

References

External links
 1956 Cleveland Browns at Pro Football Reference (profootballreference.com)
 1956 Cleveland Browns Statistics at jt-sw.com
 1956 Cleveland Browns Schedule at jt-sw.com
 1956 Cleveland Browns at DatabaseFootball.com  

Cleveland
Cleveland Browns seasons
Cleveland Browns